Mark David Setterstrom (born March 3, 1984) is a former American football guard. He was drafted by the St. Louis Rams in the seventh round of the 2006 NFL Draft. He played college football at Minnesota.

Early years 
Setterstrom earned All-State, All-Metro, and All-Conference honors as senior at Northfield High School in Minnesota, where he was a two-way lineman who totaled 127 tackles, six sacks, five forced fumbles, and six fumble recoveries over career for Northfield Raiders. Also, he was a four-year letter-winner as heavyweight wrestler, compiling a 38-3 record as a senior.

College career

Setterstrom played collegiately at the University of Minnesota from 2002-2005.  During his career with the Gophers, Mark was a two-time First-team All-Big Ten selection (2004–2005), a Second-team All-American (2005) and an All-American selection by Rivals.com in 2004. He was a Second-team All-America and First-team All-Big Ten honors as a senior as a key cog on Gophers' line that allowed three sacks, lowest in Big Ten and best in school history. As a junior, earned All-America selection by Rivals.com and First-team All-Big Ten as part of offensive line that allowed nine sacks, best in school history and second in Big Ten history. He was an Honorable mention All-Big Ten selection in sophomore year.
and a Fourth-team  All-America Freshman selection by The Sporting News and Big Ten All-Freshman Team.

Professional career

Pre-draft

St. Louis Rams
He was drafted by the Rams in the seventh round of the 2006 NFL Draft. He signed a three-year $1.08 million contract with the Rams on July 22, 2006. In his rookie season with St. Louis, Setterstrom appeared in seven games, starting six of those at left guard.  In 2007, he opened the season as starter at left guard, starting the first three games of the season before suffering a season-ending knee injury in Week 3 and he was placed on reserve/injured list 9/26/2007. Also he missed all of the 2008 season with knee injuries but was re-signed by the Rams to one-year deal during the 2009 off-season. Setterstrom was not tendered a contract by the Rams following the 2010 season, making him a free agent.

References

External links
 St. Louis Rams profile

1984 births
Living people
American football offensive guards
Minnesota Golden Gophers football players
People from Northfield, Minnesota
Players of American football from Minnesota
Sportspeople from the Minneapolis–Saint Paul metropolitan area
St. Louis Rams players